Huaral is a district in the Peruvian department of Lima. It covers an area of 665.57 km square. It starts at the Peruvian coast and continues up to the Andes. Huaral is very agricultural, and it is surrounded by hundreds of farm fields. Including its famous Huando oranges. Thus Huaral is also called "Capital of Agriculture." The population is about 160,000. The climate is warm in the coastal regions and cools toward the 4,500 m (14,763 ft) mountains. Automobile traffic is minimal. Walking, bicycles, motorcycles and tricycle motor-taxis are common modes of transportation. There are two principal highways to enter Huaral, Pasamayo and its variant. A bus trip to or from Lima costs about one dollar (3.50 soles) There are many Inca archaeological sites and other historical sites all over the area.

External links
 Maplandia.com Huaral satellite photos Huaral City is near the coast, surrounded by green farms.

Districts of the Lima Region
1890 establishments in Peru